Showpo is an Australian online fashion retailer. Primarily aimed at young women, the company's vision is "to be her go to place to shop". As of June 2017, Showpo's annual revenue was $30 million, with 35% of sales occurring internationally.

Showpo's CEO Jane Lu has described the company's social media branding as its "biggest competitive advantage". As of May 2017, the company had 1.1 million followers on Instagram and 895,100 Likes on Facebook.

History 
In 2010, Showpo was launched as "Show Pony" by co-founder Jane Lu, initially operating from her parents' garage in Balmain, Sydney. Three months after launch, the company opened a bricks and mortar store in Broadway in Sydney, followed by a kiosk in Pitt St Westfield in August 2011. In 2012, Showpo had its first million dollar month with just four staff. Showpo closed its profitable bricks and mortar stores in 2013 to focus its business solely online. In 2014, the company turned over $10 million in sales and by 2017 it had reached a run rate of $30 million.

Showpo International 
In August 2017, Showpo held its official US launch in Los Angeles, the location of its US warehouse.

Awards and recognition 
In 2014, Showpo was listed in 3rd place in Smartcompany's Smart50 Awards, with annual revenue of $7.5 million and 306.23% growth.

In 2014, Showpo won Australian Startup Daily Startup of the Year in The Australian Startup Awards.

In 2015, Jane Lu (CEO) was named Cosmopolitan Magazine's 2015 Entrepreneur of the Year.

In 2016,  Jane Lu (CEO) was listed in Smart Company's 'Hot 30 under 30'. 
 
In 2016, Jane Lu (CEO) was listed in Forbes magazine's annual '30 under 30 Asia'.

In 2017, Jane Lu (CEO) was listed in Smart Company's 'Hot 30 under 30'.

In 2017, Showpo won Online Retail Industry Awards [ORIAS] for "Best Social Commerce Initiative" and "Best Site Optimisation and Design".

In 2017, Jane Lu (CEO) was included in the Most Viewed Fashion Professionals on LinkedIn in Australia as part of LinkedIn's Power Profiles series.

In 2018, Showpo won Online Retail Industry Awards [ORIAS] for "Online Retailer of the Year", "Best International Conqueror", "Best Social Commerce Initiative" and "Best Site Optimisation & Design".

In 2019, Showpo won Online Retail Industry Awards [ORIAS] for "Best Pureplay Retailer", "Technology Champion" and entered the ORIAS Hall of Fame.

In 2022, Showpo won Best Social Commerce Initiative.

References

External links 

Clothing retailers of Australia
Companies based in Sydney
Clothing companies established in 2010
Australian companies established in 2010